The Wreckoning may refer to:

 The Wreckoning (Willam Belli album), 2012
 "The Wreckoning" (song), a 2003 song by Boomkat
The Wreckoning, the debut 2009 album by southern rock band Trainwreck.